Héctor del Curto is an Argentine tango bandoneon player. Born in Buenos Aires, he began to study tango music at a young age, winning the Best Bandoneon under 25 when only 17 years old. Following that honour, he played with the late tango giants Ástor Piazzolla and Osvaldo Pugliese among many others. During this time, he played at the Kennedy Center and Carnegie Hall.

Awards
In 2018 he won the Grammy Award for Best Latin Jazz Album for the album Jazz Tango as a member of the Pablo Ziegler Trio.

Personal life
He currently resides in New York City where he founded the Eternal Tango orchestra and quartet.

References

External links
 Official site
 Tango.info

Year of birth missing (living people)
People from Buenos Aires
Argentine musicians
Argentine songwriters
Male songwriters
Argentine bandoneonists
Tango musicians
Living people
Orquesta Osvaldo Pugliese